Novoznamenka is a rural locality (a settlement) in Krasnoznamensky Selsoviet, Kuryinsky District, Altai Krai, Russia. The population was 41 as of 2013. There is 1 street.

Geography 
Novoznamenka is located 10 km north of Kurya (the district's administrative centre) by road. Krasnoznamenka is the nearest rural locality.

References 

Rural localities in Kuryinsky District